Foolad Mahan Isfahan Basketball Club (Bashgah-e Beskâtbal-e Fulâd Mahan Sipahan Esfehan) was an Iranian professional basketball club based in Esfahan, Iran. They compete in the Iranian Basketball Super League.

Achievements

 FIBA Asia Champions Cup
Winners (1) : 2013

External links
Official website in Persian

Basketball teams in Iran
Basketball teams established in 2007